Hippophae is the genus of sea buckthorns, deciduous shrubs in the family Elaeagnaceae. The name sea buckthorn may be hyphenated to avoid confusion with the unrelated true buckthorns (Rhamnus, family Rhamnaceae). It is also referred to as sandthorn, sallowthorn, or seaberry. It produces orange-yellow berries, which have been used over centuries as food, traditional medicine, and skin treatment in Mongolia, Ladakh, Russia, Ukraine, and northern Europe, which are its origin regions.

Because Hippophae develops an aggressive and extensive root system, it is planted to inhibit soil erosion and is used in land reclamation for its nitrogen fixing properties, wildlife habitat, and soil enrichment. Hippophae berries and leaves are manufactured into various human and animal food and skincare products.

Description
The leaf arrangement can be alternate or opposite.

Hippophae goniocarpa grows in mountainous regions in Nepal and China on mountain slopes, river banks, flood lands and valley terraces. The growth altitude is typically between 2650 and 3700 m. The species is divided into two distinct subspecies, H. goniocarpa subsp. litangensis and H. goniocarpa subsp. goniocarpa. H. goniocarpa subsp. litangensis differs from the typical subspecies by the young branchlets and the lower surface of leaves. The Latin specific epithet goniocarpa refers to goniocarpus -a -um with angular fruits.
Hippophae gyantsensis
Hippophae litangensis
Hippophae neurocarpa
Hippophae rhamnoides: Common sea buckthorn has dense and stiff branches, and are very thorny. It is dioecious, with separate male and female plants. The male produces brownish flowers which produce wind-distributed pollen. The female plants produce orange berries  in diameter, soft, juicy, and rich in oils. The roots distribute rapidly and extensively, providing a nonleguminous nitrogen fixation role in surrounding soils.
Hippophae salicifolia (willow-leaved sea buckthorn) is restricted to the Himalayas, to the south of the common sea buckthorn, growing at high altitudes in dry valleys; it differs from H. rhamnoides in having broader (to ) and greener (less silvery) leaves, and yellow berries. A wild variant occurs in the same area, but at even higher altitudes in the alpine zone.
Hippophae tibetana
Hippophae × goniocarpa Y.S.Lian et al. ex Swenson & Bartish

Taxonomy and name
Hippophae is a small genus of Elaeagnaceae having a terminal taxon with seven species recognized, as of 2002. Hippophae rhamnoides is a highly variable species with eight subspecies.

In ancient times, leaves and young branches from sea buckthorn were supposedly fed as a remedy to horses to support weight gain and appearance of the coat, leading to the name of the genus, Hippophae derived from hippo (horse), and phaos (shining).

Distribution

Hippophae rhamnoides, the common sea buckthorn, is the most widespread of the species in the genus, with the ranges of its eight subspecies extending from the Atlantic coasts of Europe across to northwestern Mongolia, northwestern China and Northern Pakistan. In western Europe, it is largely confined to sea coasts where salt spray off the sea prevents other larger plants from outcompeting it. In central Asia, it is more widespread in dry semi-desert sites where other plants cannot survive the dry conditions.

In central Europe and Asia, it also occurs as a sub-alpine shrub above the tree line in mountains, and other sunny areas such as river banks where it has been used to stabilize erosion. They are tolerant of salt in the air and soil, but demand full sunlight for good growth and do not tolerate shady conditions near larger trees. They typically grow in dry, sandy areas.

Sea buckthorn USDA hardiness zones are about 3 through 7.

Varieties
During the Cold War, Russian and East German horticulturists developed new varieties with greater nutritional value, larger berries, different ripening months and branches that are easier to harvest. Over the past 20 years, experimental crops have been grown in the United States, one in Nevada and one in Arizona, and in several provinces of Canada.

Genetics
A study of nuclear ribosomal internal transcribed spacer sequence data showed that the genus can be divided into three clades:
 H. tibetana
 H. rhamnoides with the exception of H. rhamnoides ssp. gyantsensis (=H. gyantsensis)
 remaining species

A study using chloroplast sequences and morphology, however, recovered only two clades:
 H. tibetana, H. gyantsensis, H. salicifolia, H. neurocarpa
 H. rhamnoides

Natural history
The fruit is an important winter food resource for some birds, notably fieldfares.

Leaves are eaten by the larva of the coastal race of the ash pug moth and by larvae of other Lepidoptera, including brown-tail, dun-bar, emperor moth, mottled umber, and Coleophora elaeagnisella.

Uses

Products
Sea buckthorn berries are edible and nutritious, though astringent, sour, and oily  unless bletted (frosted to reduce the astringency) and/or mixed as a drink with sweeter substances such as apple or grape juice. Additionally, malolactic fermentation of sea buckthorn juice reduces sourness, enhancing its sensory properties. The mechanism behind this change is transformation of malic acid into lactic acid in microbial metabolism.

When the berries are pressed, the resulting sea buckthorn juice separates into three layers: on top is a thick, orange cream; in the middle, a layer containing sea buckthorn's characteristic high content of saturated and polyunsaturated fats; and the bottom layer is sediment and juice. The upper two layers contain fat sources applicable for cosmetic purposes and can be processed for skin creams and liniments, whereas the bottom layer can be used for edible products such as syrup.

Besides juice, sea buckthorn fruit can be used to make pies, jams, lotions, teas, fruit wines, and liquors. The juice or pulp has other potential applications in foods, beverages, or cosmetics products such as shower gel. Fruit drinks were among the earliest sea buckthorn products developed in China. Sea buckthorn-based juice is common in Germany and Scandinavian countries. It provides a beverage rich in vitamin C and carotenoids. Sea buckthorn berries are also used to produce rich orange-coloured ice-cream, with a melon-type taste and hints of citrus.

For its troops confronting low winter temperatures (see Siachen), India's Defence Research and Development Organisation established a factory in Leh to manufacture a multivitamin herbal beverage based on sea buckthorn juice.

The seed and pulp oils have nutritional properties that vary under different processing methods. Sea buckthorn oils are used as a source for ingredients in several commercially available cosmetic products and nutritional supplements.

Landscape uses
Sea buckthorn may be used as a landscaping shrub with an aggressive basal shoot system used for barrier hedges and windbreaks, and to stabilize riverbanks and steep slopes. They have value in northern climates for their landscape qualities, as the colorful berry clusters are retained through winter. Branches may be used by florists for designing ornaments.

In northwestern China, sea buckthorn shrubs have been planted on the bottoms of dry riverbeds to increase water retention of the soil, thus decreasing sediment loss. Because of increased moisture conservation of the soil and nitrogen-fixing capabilities of sea buckthorn, vegetation levels have increased in areas where sea buckthorn have been planted. Sea buckthorn was once distributed free of charge to Canadian prairie farmers by PFRA to be used in shelterbelts.

Folk medicine and research

Sea buckthorn has been used over centuries in traditional medicine. Although sea buckthorn fruit extracts are under preliminary research for their pharmacological effects, there is no high-quality clinical evidence for the ability of Hippophae products to lower the risk of human diseases. As of 2022, no sea buckthorn products are approved as prescription drugs by any national regulatory agency. 

Berry oil from seeds or fruit pulp, either taken orally as a dietary supplement or applied topically, is believed to be a skin softener or medicine, but there is inadequate clinical evidence of its effectiveness. There have been no systematic studies of toxicity and safety for any Hippophae product.

Organizations
The International Seabuckthorn Association, formerly the International Center for Research and Training on Seabuckthorn (ICRTS), was formed jointly in 1988 by the China Research and Training Center on Seabuckthorn, the Seabuckthorn Office of the Yellow River Water Commission, and the Shaanxi Seabuckthorn Development Office. From 1995 to 2000, ICRTS published the research journal, Hippophae, which appears to be no longer active.

In 2005 - 2007, the "EAN-Seabuck" network between European Union states, China, Russia and New Independent States was funded by the European Commission to promote sustainable crop and consumer product development.

In Mongolia, there is an active National Association of Seabuckthorn Cultivators and Producers.

See also
Sea buckthorn oil
Wolfberry, a native Asian plant occasionally mistaken for sea buckthorn

References

Further reading

Todd, J. Introduction to sea-buckthorn, Ontario Ministry of Food, Agriculture and Rural Affairs, February, 2006

External links

United States Department of Agriculture Seaberry Profile
Plants for a Future
Purdue University list of articles

 
Berries
Dioecious plants
Flora of Europe
Flora of Western Asia
Flora of Central Asia
Flora of West Himalaya
Nitrogen-fixing crops
Plants used in Ayurveda
Taxa named by Carl Linnaeus